Swissporarena is a multi-use stadium in Lucerne, Switzerland, completed in 2011. It is used mostly for football matches and hosts the home matches of FC Luzern of the Swiss Super League. The stadium has a capacity of 16,800 spectators, including an away fans' section fitted with 390 rail seats for safe standing.  It replaced the demolished Stadion Allmend.

The stadium was due to open earlier in the year but several problems during construction changed the plans. In February 2011 the club announced the new season ticket prices for their return home.

The stadium held its first match, a 0–0 against FC Thun on 31 July 2011.

Since November 2012, the stadium and surrounding area has been served by the underground Lucerne Allmend/Messe railway station.

International matches

International matches

Gallery

See also 
 List of football stadiums in Switzerland

References

External links 

 Stadium information

Football venues in Switzerland
FC Luzern
Buildings and structures in Lucerne
Tourist attractions in the canton of Lucerne